Rose Marie Kouaho (born 27 October 1977) is an Ivorian judoka. She competed in the women's lightweight event at the 2000 Summer Olympics.

References

1977 births
Living people
Ivorian female judoka
Olympic judoka of Ivory Coast
Judoka at the 2000 Summer Olympics
Place of birth missing (living people)
African Games medalists in judo
Competitors at the 1999 All-Africa Games
African Games bronze medalists for Ivory Coast